The cuisine of Sardinia is the traditional cuisine of the island of Sardinia, and the expression of its culinary art. It is characterised by its own variety, and by the fact of having been enriched through a number of interactions with the other Mediterranean cultures while retaining its own identity. Sardinia's food culture is strictly divided into food from the land and food from the sea, reflecting the island's historical vicissitudes and especially its geographic landscapes, spacing from the coastline to the ragged mountains of the interior. The Sardinian cuisine is considered part of the Mediterranean diet, a nutritional model that was proclaimed by UNESCO as an intangible cultural heritage.

Seafood

Typical dishes of Cagliari are the fregula cun còciula ("fregula with clams"); the còciula e cotza a sa schiscionera ("clams and mussels cooked in a pan"), and then the burrida a sa casteddaja (based on dogfish, vinegar and walnuts), the cassòla, a soup combining various kinds of fish, crustaceans and mollusks;  s'aligusta a sa casteddaja  ("Cagliaritan-style lobster"); the common spaghitus with clams and butàriga, and the spaghitus cun arritzonis, that is sea urchin spaghetti with artichoke or wild asparagus.
The cuisine typical of the Oristano area and the Cabras ponds, but even Bosa, often include eels. From the fish eggs, the mullet botargo is extracted, which can be served alone or used to dress the pasta. Another traditional product is sa merca, made up of slices of boiled and salted mullet being wrapped in a sack aromitized with a paludal herb, the zibba (obione in Italian). A variety of the burrida (dogfish) can also be tasted.
Along the Sulcis coastline are some of the most ancient tuna fisheries of the Mediterranean. The local cuisine is influenced by Genoa, and is strongly based on bluefin tuna fishing and related products, like botargo, the tuna heart, the musciame, the buzzonaglia, the lattume and the Tabarchin cascà, a variety of the couscous dressed with vegetables.
The cuisine of Alghero reflects the Catalan influence permeating the town, which can be seen from the Catalan way with which the lobster is prepared, that is boiled with tomato, celery and onion and accompanied by a sauce of lemon, olive oil, salt and pepper.
Towards Santa Teresa and the Maddalena archipelago, octopus salads are a typical specialty, while in Olbia there are dishes based on mussels and clams. From both the north and the south of the island are the so-called Ortziadas or Bultigghjata, floured and fried sea anemones.

Inland and mountain food

First courses
Here are some typical first courses:

the malloreddus are tapered-shaped durum wheat semolina pasta traditionally flavored with saffron. They are usually seasoned with Campidano or sausage sauce, but among the typical recipes there is the variant with Casu furriau that is with melted cheese and saffron. They are also known as cigiones in Sassari and Cravaos in Nuoro, and - in Italian - Gnocchetti sardi; [5]
the culurgiones are fresh durum wheat dumplings filled with ricotta and mint, or with a filling based on potato, fresh cheese and mint;

lorighittas are pasta prepared since ancient times in Morgongiori, a small town in the middle of the island, weaving a double strand of pasta;
the macarrones de busa, that is a sort of bucatini made with a special elongated iron;
the macarrones furriaos, dumplings topped with very fresh pecorino cheese, melted together with the bran to form a sort of cream;
the macarrones cravàos, o de punzu or macarrones de ùngia, in gallurese called chiusòni or ciusòni, are particular small dumplings of durum wheat semolina in the form of small cylinders of 3–4 cm in size, spread all over the island but in particular in Gallura; [6]
the fregula is instead a particular dry pasta made from durum wheat semolina, worked in small lumps and used for typical dishes such as fregula with clams or fregula with sauce. It is also used to make soups with meat broths; [7]
the gallurese soup or suppa cuatta is a dish consisting of Sardinian bread, casizolu, spices and pecorino cheese, all softened with broth and cooked in the oven;
typical of the sassarese is the fabadda (favata), traditionally prepared during the carnival period and consists of a soup made with dried beans, cabbage, fennel, pork rind and pork;
the panada is a timbale made with puff pastry and stuffed with lamb (or eels), potatoes and dried tomatoes, and is a specialty of Assemini, Oschiri, Berchidda, Pattada and Cuglieri;
the pane frattau or bread carasau soaked in the broth, arranged in layers interspersed with grated pecorino and tomato sauce and with a poached egg on top;
the soup and 'merca, made with su succu, a particular type of pasta similar to tagliolini, with tomatoes, zucchini, potatoes (depending on the variants), with the final addition of curdled sheep's milk (frue);
filindeu is a pasta that is made only in Nuoro, made with the finest semolina, woven in a particular way and served with sheep's broth and plenty of fresh cheese;
su succu, first dish typical of Busachi, prepared with very thin tagliolini, or angel hair, cooked in sheep's broth, flavored with saffron in stigmas, and seasoned with fresh, acidulous pecorino.

Second courses

Porchetta or porcetto, in Sardinian porceddu or porcheddu, the suckling pig of about 4 – 5 kg or twenty days, cooked slowly on a spit, on grills and flavored after cooking with myrtle or rosemary. This roast is a classic of Sardinian pastoral cuisine [8];
roast suckling lamb, weighing a maximum of 7 kg, white flesh and soft and intense flavor is a tradition among the oldest of the island, always a land of shepherds of which this dish was one of the most typical habits food. Lamb meat also forms the basis of various typical Panadas;
roast baby goat is a particularly sought after dish. The kid is roasted slowly on a spit. Normally the only seasoning is the fine salt, which is given during cooking.

wild boar meat cooked with the carraxu method (cooking in an underground hole). This particular cooking consists in filling the embers hole to heat the walls; Once the ash has been removed, the branches of myrtle and thyme are spread out on the bottom, laying the wild boar on top of it and then covering it with other branches; then closes the hole with the earth and lights up on it a fire. It is also cooked in sweet and sour, cutting the meat into small pieces and browning it in chopped onion, parsley, myrtle and thyme and then adding vinegar and tomato sauce [9];

Cordula or Cordedda consists of intestines of braided kid or lamb cooked and wrapped around a spit or cooking it in a pan with peas (cordula cun pisurci) or other variants [10];
the trattalia or Tattaliu, based on lamb or goat's breast, is cooked roasted with a spit, piercing alternating pieces of liver, heart, sweetbreads, and lung that must first be partially cooked, wrapped with peritoneum and tied with all the neatly cleaned, or in a pan with peas or artichokes [11];
the Zurrette or "sambene" is a dish prepared with sheep's blood seasoned with animal fat (obtained by frying a beat of "tripe" tramacuo - the omentum of the sheep - in extra virgin olive oil), onion, thyme snake and mint (puleu, wild mint), grated pecorino and shredded carasau bread, cooked inside the animal's stomach, by boiling or, rarely, on the embers.
the Berbeche in coat or the boiled sheep with onions and potatoes, served with carasau bread soaked in the cooking broth.
i Pillonis de tàccula is a dish based on game, mainly thrushes (durduros) and merlons (meurra) boiled, salted and flavored with myrtle leaves;
the zimino or ziminu cooked in a grabiglia or veal entrails such as the parasangu (diaphragm), the cannaculu (intestine), heart, kidneys, liver and spleen, cooked in a grill on the grill is a traditional sassarese dish.
le Mungetas or snails (also called snails), in their various sizes ranging from the minudda ciuta (Theba pisana) boiled with potatoes, to the thick ciogas (Eobania vermiculata) prepared with a spicy sauce or with garlic and parsley, to the coir (Cornu aspersum) that are served filled with a mixture of cheese, eggs, parsley and breadcrumbs, to the Mungetas cooked in a pan with garlic, oil, parsley and breadcrumbs. As well as a typical dish from Ossi and Sassari, they are present as a specialty in Gesico nel Medio Campidano [12].
Su Ghisadu typical logudorese dish of sheep's meat or wild pork roasted over low heat with tomato, bay leaf, garlic and parsley; the sauce is an excellent condiment for gnocchetti "cicciones" or ravioli "colunzones".
The small spit ispinada where sheep meat is stuffed into softer cuts, alternating with parts of the back fat.

Sweets
Even desserts, like the other products of Sardinian gastronomy, vary considerably from region to region. Here are the most known ones:

the Seadas or Sebadas, are discs of thin dough that enclose a filling of fresh, slightly sour pecorino cheese, melted with semolina, or fresh cow, and flavored with lemon, fried and covered with melted honey, preferably bitter (like that of corbezzolo);
the Casadinas, typical of Logudoro and Barbagia, are filled pasta pies with a low layer of lemon-flavored fresh cheese. Their traduction for Italians is Formaggelle; they are also widespread in the variant with ricotta and take the name of Regotinas or in Italian Ricottelle.
the Pàrdulas are very similar to the Casadinas but the filling is based on ricotta, they have a domed appearance, are softer than casadinas and are covered with powdered or granulated sugar. They are typical of Campidano.
Aranzada is a common dessert in the Baronies and in the Nuoro area. It is prepared with candied orange peel in honey and toasted almonds, rhomboidal in shape and presented on an orange leaf;
the Pabassinas, Papassinos or Pabassinus, in Italian Papassini, are spread all over the territory and are prepared with semolina, walnuts, raisins, almonds or hazelnuts;
the Cattas, Frigjolas or Frisolas or Frisjoli longhi are prepared mainly during the carnival and are made with flour, potatoes, water, sugar, anise and grated orange peel, fried in the form of long cords;
the Orilletas are a dessert prepared with flour dough and eggs. After frying they are immersed in a hot syrup of honey and water;
the Copulettas are a double disk of thin shortcrust pastry filled with sapa or cooked honey. They are mainly spread in the Goceano and in Ozieri;

the Gueffus or Guelfos, in Italian Sospiri, balls made of ground almonds, sugar and lemon. They are typical of Ozieri and packed with small sheets of colored paper;
Candelaus are desserts prepared in the most varied forms and prepared with a dough of almond paste that incorporates a mixture of fresh almonds, flavored with orange blossom water and glazed;
the Pistocus finis, in Italian Biscotti di Fonni, also called the 'Sardinian Ladyfinger Biscuits';
the Tziliccas, Tiriccas or Caschettas, with a horseshoe, crescent or heart shape. They consist of an external part of short pastry and a filling that depending on the area can be either sapa and walnuts, or honey and saffron;
the Is Angules are a sweet typical of the Ortueri area, with a round shape, amber-colored, decorated with drawings made with the momperiglia with the shapes of flowers, fruit or animals;
the Bianchinos, Bianchittus or Bianchittos, are meringues, prepared with whipped egg whites, of pyramidal shape and of very friable structure, often garnished with almonds;
the Cruxoneddus de mèndula or Culurgioneddos de mèndula are raviolini made with puff pastry filled with almonds, fried and cdusted with powdered sugar. They are also found stuffed with custard, ricotta or sapa cream;
Amarettos, also called Marigosos, are sweet macaroons prepared with ingredients based on sweet almonds (about 70%) and bitter almonds (30%), sugar, egg white and lemon peel;
the Bucconettes, typical of the Barbì of Belvì, are prepared with toasted and chopped hazelnuts, grated zest of lemon and orange, mixed, shaped into balls and cooked in honey syrup and sugar, wrapped in tinfoil and then in sheets of colored paper;
the Abbamele is one of the oldest gastronomic products of the rural culture of Sardinia, made of honey. It is also called "decoction of honey" or "honey and pollen" or "honey sapa" in other regions of Italy;
the Pane 'e saba, a typical winter sweet from barbaricino oven, prepared with the saba;
the nougat of Tonara, as well as those of Pattada, Ozieri and Orgosolo, has an ivory color because it is prepared with honey from the Mediterranean;

the Rujolos are ricotta balls and grated orange or lemon peel then dipped in a hot solution of water and honey (to grind);
Gatò de mèndula is a crunchy of toasted almonds and flavored with orange peel;
Mandagadas are also known as Tritzas, Acciuleddi. They are desserts made of a braided and honey-impregnated dough. They are prepared with durum wheat flour, eggs and Sardinian honey;
the Mustatzolos, or Mustaciolus, as the Papassinos are lozenge-shaped and flavored with lemon, cinnamon and glazed in the upper part;
the Papai-biancu, typical in the city of Alghero with the name of Manjar blanc in Catalan, is prepared with cream of milk, starch and lemon peel.
the Pistoccheddus de capa, a dessert originally from the village of Serrenti, a hard golden-shaped biscuit shaped according to animal shapes and covered with icing "sa cappa", silver little devils and gilded friezes.

Bread

Pane carasau is a bread with the shape of thin, very crunchy discs obtained through a double cooking in a wood oven; it can be consumed dry even after many days or slightly wet and rolled up; guttiau bread is a preparation of the same carasau bread that is heated in the oven with a little oil and salt;
the Pistoccu is produced mainly in Ogliastra. It is prepared in the same way as carasau, but has a more consistent thickness and is preferred to consume it moist;
the Civraxiu or Civargiu is a large loaf typical of Campidani and southern Sardinia in general;
the Coccoi a pitzus is a type of decorated bread, once produced for the great occasions, today always present;
the Modditzos (from "modditzi", the common mastic in the Mediterranean stain that provides the scented wood used for cooking) is circular in shape and very soft, also produced with the addition of potatoes, mainly in the area of Dorgali but widespread on all the regional territory;
the Zichi, typical of Bonorva;
the Spianada, of circular and soft shape, characteristic of the nuorese, was once prepared during the monthly bread making of Pane carasau and consumed in the following days.

Wine
Several vineyards are present in every corner across the island, from the Campidanese and coastal plains, to the hilly and mountainous highlands. The particular composition of the soil and the sunny climate allow for high quality productions. The long winemaking tradition has its roots in the Nuraghic past, and from then on it did not suffer any interruptions since the island never fell under Arab rule, and thus the Islamic prohibition on alcohol did not affect Sardinia at all; on the contrary, winemaking saw a major increase in the Byzantine and the Judgedoms period. Today, there are 15 IGT, 19 DOC and 1 Docg wines on the island.
The Cannonau is a typical sardinian red wine very rich in phenols made from Grenache grapes - perfect for red meats.

Cheese
One of the popular cheeses of the area is casu marzu, a Sardinian sheep's milk cheese that contains live maggots to help assist the fermentation of the cheese.

Bibliography
Costantina Frau, Mandigos e usanzias in Sardinna, CUEC, 2000
Alessandro Molinari Pradelli, La cucina sarda, Newton Compton Editore, 2002, .
Pietro Oliva, Maria Giovanna Poli, Cucina sarda, Giunti Editore, 2004, .
AA.VV, Anna Pau e Paolo Piquereddu, Pani, tradizione e prospettive della panificazione in Sardegna, Nuoro, Edizioni Ilisso, 2005, .
Laura Rangoni, La cucina sarda di mare, Edizioni Newton Compton, 2007, .
Bonoreddu Colomo, Cianedda Pala, Sa Cuchina sarda, Guida alla gastronomia isolana (three volumes), Editrice Archivio Fotografico Sardo, 2013.
Costantina Frau, Alimentos Sardos in dies de festa, 70 ricette tradizionali delle antiche feste, Archivio Fotografico Sardo, 2014. 
Antonella Serrenti - Susanna Trossero, Il pane carasau. Storie e ricette di un'antica tradizione isolana, Perugia, Graphe.it edizioni, 2014, .
Guigoni A., Cibo identitario della Sardegna, ISRE, 2019.

External links